Located in Silchar, India, The Cachar Club was opened in 1859 by colonial British who were engaged in the tea planting business. Initially, membership was open to only Europeans, but this opened up to include Indians as well. The club-house is in a colonial style, and was completely renovated in February 2008. The club has a restaurant, bar, accommodation, a health club and conference hall.

The members helped develop the modern game of Polo during the later years of the 19th century.

See also
 List of India's gentlemen's clubs

References

External links
Official website

Silchar
Sports clubs in India
Polo in India
Polo clubs
Sports clubs in Assam